Globe Institute of Technology was a private for-profit college in New York City. It offered baccalaureate, associate, and certificate programs in business and information technology as well as a sports program. Globe Institute of Technology was accredited by the New York State Board of Regents prior to ceasing operations in 2016.

Notable alumni
Joe Powell, professional gridiron football player
Jihad Ward, professional gridiron football player

References

For-profit universities and colleges in the United States
Universities and colleges in Manhattan
Defunct private universities and colleges in New York City